4179 Toutatis, provisional designation , is an elongated, stony asteroid and slow rotator, classified as a near-Earth object and potentially hazardous asteroid of the Apollo asteroid and Alinda asteroid groups, approximately 2.5 kilometers in diameter. Discovered by French astronomer Christian Pollas at Caussols in 1989, the asteroid was named after Toutatis from Celtic mythology.

Toutatis is also a Mars-crosser asteroid with a chaotic orbit produced by a 3:1 resonance with the planet Jupiter, a 1:4 resonance with the planet Earth, and frequent close approaches to the terrestrial planets, including Earth. In December 2012, Toutatis passed within about 18 lunar distances of Earth. The Chinese lunar probe Chang'e 2 flew by the asteroid at a distance of 3.2 kilometers and a relative velocity of 10.73 km/s. Toutatis approached Earth again in 2016, but will not make another notably close approach until 2069.

Properties 

Toutatis was first sighted on 10 February 1934, as object 1934 CT, but lost soon afterwards. It remained a lost asteroid for several decades until it was rediscovered on 4 January 1989 by French astronomer Christian Pollas, and was named after the Celtic god of tribal protection Toutatis (Teutates). The name of this god is very familiar in France due to the catchphrase Par Toutatis! by the Gauls in the comics Asterix.

The spectral properties suggest that this is an S-type, or stony asteroid, consisting primarily of silicates. It has a moderate Bond albedo of 0.13. Radar imagery shows that Toutatis is a highly irregular body consisting of two distinct lobes, with maximum widths of about 4.6 km and 2.4 km, respectively. It is hypothesized that Toutatis formed from two originally separate bodies which coalesced at some point, with the resultant asteroid being compared to a rubble pile.

Its rotation combines two separate periodic motions into a non-periodic result; to someone on the surface of Toutatis, the Sun would seem to rise and set in apparently random locations and at random times at the asteroid's horizon. It has a rotation period around its long axis (Pψ) of 5.38 days. This long axis is precessing with a period (Pφ) of 7.38 days. The asteroid may have lost most of its original angular momentum and entered into this tumbling motion as a result of the YORP effect.

Orbit 

With a semimajor axis of 2.5294 AU, or roughly 2.5 times the distance between Earth and the Sun, Toutatis has a 3:1 orbital resonance with Jupiter and a near-1:4 resonance with Earth making it a member of the Alinda asteroid group. It thus completes one orbit around the Sun for every 4.02 annual orbits of Earth. The gravitational perturbations caused by frequent close approaches to the terrestrial planets lead to chaotic behavior in the orbit of Toutatis, making precise long-term predictions of its location progressively inaccurate over time. Estimates in 1993 put the Lyapunov time horizon for predictability at around 50 years, after which the uncertainty region becomes larger with each close approach to a planet. Without the perturbations from the terrestrial planets the Lyapunov time would be close to 10,000 years. The initial observations that showed its chaotic behavior were made by Wiśniewski.

The low inclination (0.47°) of the orbit allows frequent transits, where the inner planets Mercury, Venus, Earth, and Mars can appear to cross the Sun as seen from the perspective of Toutatis. Earth did this in January 2009, July 2012, July 2016 and 2020.

Close approaches and collision risk 

Toutatis makes frequent close approaches to Earth, with a currently minimum possible distance (Earth MOID) of just 0.006 AU (2.3 times as far as the Moon). The approach on 29 September 2004 was particularly close, at 0.0104 AU (within 4 lunar distances) from Earth, presenting a good opportunity for observation, with Toutatis having an apparent magnitude of 8.8 at its brightest. A close approach of  happened on 9 November 2008. At magnitude 10.7, Toutatis was not visible to the naked eye, but just visible to experienced observers using high-end binoculars. During the 2012 encounter Toutatis was recovered on 21 May 2012, by the Siding Spring Survey at apparent magnitude 18.9.

Given that Toutatis makes many close approaches to Earth, such as in 1992, 1996, 2000, 2004, 2008, 2012, and 2016, it is listed as a potentially hazardous object. With an uncertainty parameter of 0, the orbit of Toutatis is very well determined for the next few hundred years. The probability of the orbit intersecting Earth is essentially zero for at least the next six centuries. The likelihood of collision in the distant future is considered to be very small. As a planet-crossing asteroid, Toutatis is likely to be ejected from the inner Solar System within a few million years. In 2004 a chain e-mail falsely claimed that Toutatis had a 63% chance of impacting Earth then. In fact, Toutatis passed by at 1.5 million kilometres, or about four Earth–Moon distances, as predicted.

In 2006 Toutatis came closer than 2 AU to Jupiter; its orbit lies inside of Jupiter's. In the 2100s, it will approach Jupiter many times at a similar distance.

Physical characteristics 

Large amounts of data of Toutatis were obtained during Chang'e 2's flyby. Toutatis is not a monolith, but most likely a coalescence of shattered fragments. This bifurcated asteroid is shown to be mainly consisting of a head (small lobe) and a body (large lobe). The two major parts are not round in shape, and their surfaces have a number of large facets. In comparison with radar models, the proximate observations from Chang'e 2's flyby have revealed several remarkable discoveries concerning Toutatis, among which the presence of the giant basin at the big end appears to be one of the most compelling geological features, and the sharply perpendicular silhouette in the neck region that connects the head and body is also quite novel. A large number of boulders and several short linear structures are also apparent on the surface.

Giant basin 

The giant basin at the big end of Toutatis has a diameter of ~805 m, suggesting that one or more impactors may have collided with it there. The most significant feature is the ridge around the largest basin. The wall of this basin has a relatively high density of lineaments, some of which seem to be concentric to the basin. These ridges are indicative of an internal structure of small bodies and most of the ridges near the largest basin at the big end are most likely related to the huge stress energy during impact.

Observation 

Toutatis has been observed with radar imaging from the Arecibo Observatory and the Goldstone Solar System Radar during the asteroid's prior Earth flybys in 1992, 1996, 2000, 2004, and 2008. It was also observed with radar during the December 2012 flyby and observed more distant flyby with radar in December 2016. After 2016, Toutatis will not pass close to Earth again until 2069.

Resolution of the radar images is as fine as 3.75 m per pixel, providing data to model Toutatis's shape and spin state.

Exploration 

The Chinese lunar probe Chang'e 2 departed from the Sun–Earth L2 point in April 2012 and made a flyby of Toutatis on 13 December 2012, with closest approach being 3.2 kilometers and a relative velocity of 10.73 km/s, when Toutatis was near its closest approach to Earth. It took several pictures of the asteroid, revealing it to be a dusty red/orange color.

See also 
 List of asteroid close approaches to Earth
 List of minor planets and comets visited by spacecraft

References

External links

 More Chang'E 2 Toutatis flyby images (Emily Lakdawalla : 2013/01/20)
 Chang'E 2 images of Toutatis - 13 December 2012  (Planetary Society)
 CCTV13 Special (all in Mandarin)
 China joined the interplanetary club by successfully imaging the asteroid Toutatis (Franck Marchis, 14 December 2012)
 Chinese space probe flies by asteroid Toutatis (Xinhua 2012-12-15)
 Surface Features of Asteroid Toutatis Revealed by Radar (YouTube: JPLnews)
 Goldstone radar images from the 2012 flyby
 Toutatis radar information
 Space.com: Video of Toutatis's close approach to Earth, 29 Sept, 2004
 Interesting views of asteroid
 Astrobiology Magazine article (09/27/04)
 Simulating the orbit of Toutatis exposes its resonance with Jupiter (Gravity Simulator)
 Asteroid 4179 Toutatis' upcoming encounters with Earth and Chang'E 2 (Emily Lakdawalla 2012-12-06)
 Six-Centimeter Radar Observations of 4179 Toutatis
 Size comparison (Source)
 Chang'e 2 fly-by of Toutatis Presentation from Small Bodies Assessment Group (SBAG) 8 meeting
 Boulders on asteroid Toutatis as observed by Chang'e-2 (arXiv:1511.00766 : 3 Nov 2015)
 
 
 

004179
004179
Discoveries by Christian Pollas
Named minor planets
004179
004179
20121213
004179
004179
20121212
19890104